Micha Asher Perles is an Israeli mathematician working in geometry, a professor emeritus at the Hebrew University. He earned his Ph.D. in 1964 from the Hebrew University, under the supervision of Branko Grünbaum.
His contributions include:
The Perles configuration, a set of nine points in the Euclidean plane whose collinearities can be realized only by using irrational numbers as coordinates. Perles used this configuration to prove the existence of irrational polytopes in higher dimensions.
The Perles–Sauer–Shelah lemma, a result in extremal set theory whose proof was credited to Perles by Saharon Shelah.
The pumping lemma for context-free languages, a widely used method for proving that a language is not context-free that Perles discovered with Yehoshua Bar-Hillel and Eli Shamir.
Notable students of Perles include Noga Alon, Gil Kalai, and Nati Linial.

References

External links
 Micha Asher Perles' home page
 Micha A. Perles' publication list at DBLP
 Micha A. Perles' online publications at arXiv
 

Israeli mathematicians
Living people
Year of birth missing (living people)